Oregon Route 207 is an Oregon state highway running from U.S. Route 26 in Mitchell to U.S. Route 730 near Cold Springs Junction.

Part of OR 207 is included in the Blue Mountain Scenic Byway.

Route description 

OR 207 begins at an intersection with US 26 in Mitchell. The route continues northward to an intersection with Oregon Route 19 in Service Creek. The route then overlaps OR 19 and heads east through Spray. East of Spray, the concurrency with OR 19 ends and OR 207 continues north through the Umatilla National Forest and into Morrow County, passing through Hardman and Ruggs. At Ruggs, OR 207 overlaps Oregon Route 206, heading north to Heppner. The concurrency with OR 206 ends at Heppner and OR 207 overlaps Oregon Route 74 and heads north to Lexington. It continues past a turnoff to Echo through Sand Hollow and then crosses Interstate 84. It continues north to Hermiston, where it crosses U.S. Route 395.

OR 207 consists of the following named highways (see Oregon highways and routes):

 The Service Creek-Mitchell Highway
 Part of the John Day Highway No. 5
 The Heppner-Spray Highway No. 321
 Part of the Wasco-Heppner Highway No. 300
 Part of the Heppner Highway No. 52
 Part of the Lexington-Echo Highway No. 320
 The Hermiston Highway No. 333

Major intersections 
Mileposts reset several times along OR 207, and in some cases appear to reverse direction, because Oregon numbers mileposts by highways.

Related routes 
 U.S. Route 30

References 
 Oregon Department of Transportation, Descriptions of US and Oregon Routes, page 18
 Oregon Department of Transportation, Hermiston Highway No. 333
 Oregon Department of Transportation, Lexington-Echo Highway No. 321
 Oregon Department of Transportation, Heppner Highway No. 52
 Oregon Department of Transportation, Wasco-Heppner Highway No. 300
 Oregon Department of Transportation, Heppner-Spray Highway No. 321
 Oregon Department of Transportation, John Day Highway No. 5
 Oregon Department of Transportation, Service Creek-Mitchell Highway No. 390
 Eastern Oregon Visitor's Association, Blue Mountain Scenic Byway

207
Hermiston, Oregon
Transportation in Umatilla County, Oregon
Transportation in Morrow County, Oregon
Transportation in Wheeler County, Oregon
Heppner, Oregon